Jalan Ayer Hitam Labu (Perak state route A180) is a major road in Perak, Malaysia.

List of junctions

Ayer Hitam Labu